Al-Mundhir II ibn Yahya ibn al-Mundhir Mu'azz al-Dawlah or Mundhir II was the third head of the Banu Tujib group. He ruled the Taifa of Zaragoza from 1036 to 1038.

References
 List of Muslim rulers

 

Emirs of Zaragoza
11th-century rulers in Al-Andalus
11th-century Arabs